The 2018 NCAA Division II Cross Country Championships was the 61st annual NCAA Men's Division II Cross Country Championship and the 38th annual NCAA Women's Division II Cross Country Championship to determine the team and individual national champions of NCAA Division II men's and women's collegiate cross country running in the United States. In all, four different titles were contested: men's and women's individual and team championships. Results were track and field results reporting system. In the men's 10k, Marcelo Laguera of CSU–Pueblo took home the individual title in 31:46.4, while Grand Valley State University won the team title, scoring 89 points and defeating second-placed Colorado School of Mines (99) and third-placed Western Colorado University (117). In the women's 6k, Sarah Berger of the Grand Valley State University won the individual title in 22:07.7, while Grand Valley State University won the team title with 41 points, beating second-placed University of Mary (83) and third-placed Adams State University (90).

Women's title
Distance: 6,000 meters

Women's Team Result (Top 10)

Women's Individual Result (Top 10)

Men's title
Distance: 10,000 meters

Men's Team Result (Top 10)

Men's Individual Result (Top 10)

See also
 NCAA Men's Division I Cross Country Championship 
 NCAA Women's Division I Cross Country Championship 
 NCAA Men's Division II Cross Country Championship 
 NCAA Women's Division II Cross Country Championship 
 NCAA Men's Division III Cross Country Championship 
 NCAA Women's Division III Cross Country Championship

References
 

NCAA Cross Country Championships
NCAA Division II Cross Country Championships
NCAA Division II Cross Country Championships